Octopus tree is a common name for several plants and may refer to:
Didierea madagascariensis,  a densely spiny succulent plant in the family Didiereaceae
Schefflera actinophylla, an evergreen tree with compound leaves in the family Araliaceae